The following is a list of attorneys general of North Dakota. Attorneys general previously were elected to a two year-term, which was extended to four in 1964.

See also
North Dakota Attorney General

External links
State of North Dakota official website
Former North Dakota attorneys general

Attorneys